Hands of Time (sometimes referred to as The Hands of Time) is the seventh season of the computer-animated television series Ninjago: Masters of Spinjitzu (titled Ninjago from the eleventh season onward). The series was created by Michael Hegner and Tommy Andreasen. The season aired from 15 to 26 May 2017, following the television special titled Day of the Departed. It is succeeded by the eighth season titled Sons of Garmadon. Hands of Time was the only season released in 2017 and was the last season to be produced before the release of The Lego Ninjago Movie.

The season introduces the two main antagonists called the "Hands of Time" (also known as the "Time Twins"), two brothers who are Elemental Masters and have the ability to control time. The storyline follows the Hands of Time as they retrieve four time blades scattered across Ninjago and involves the main ninja characters Kai and Nya following the Time Twins back through time. The season ends with a cliffhanger that involves Sensei Wu being lost in time, which was not resolved until the release of Sons of Garmadon.

Voice cast

Main 

 Jillian Michaels as Lloyd Garmadon, the Green Ninja
 Vincent Tong as Kai, the red ninja and Elemental Master of Fire
 Michael Adamthwaite as Jay, the blue ninja and Elemental Master of Lightning
 Brent Miller as Zane, the white ninja and Elemental Master of Ice
 Kirby Morrow as Cole, the black ninja and Elemental Master of Earth
 Kelly Metzger as Nya, Kai's sister
 Paul Dobson as Sensei Wu, the wise teacher of the ninja
Michael Daingerfield as Krux/Dr. Saunders
 Ian Hanlin as Acronix

Supporting 

 Jennifer Hayward as P.I.X.A.L. a female nindroid
 Kathleen Barr as Misako
Kathleen Barr as Machia
 Lee Tockar as Cyrus Borg
Brian Dobson as Ronin
Alan Marriott as Dareth
 Vincent Tong as Ray
 Jillian Michaels as Maya

Release 
On 19 December 2016, a 60-second trailer to promote the season was released on the Lego YouTube channel. The season premiered on Cartoon Network on 15 May 2017 with the release of the first episode titled The Hands of Time. The subsequent episodes were released throughout May 2017 until the release of the season finale titled Lost in Time on 26 May of the same year.

Plot 
Acronix emerges from the time vortex, after being trapped for 40 years, and Master Wu challenges him in combat. During the fight, the Forward Time Blade arrives through the vortex and Acronix uses it to hit Wu with a time punch that accelerates his aging. Acronix reunites with his brother Krux. Wu relates the history of the Hands of Time, twin brothers, who were once allied with the Elemental Masters, but betrayed them. Ray and Maya had forged four Time Blades, which Wu and Garmadon used to absorb the twins' elemental powers, before banishing them into the vortex. Krux had emerged from the vortex years ago and disguised himself as Dr. Sander Saunders, curator of the Ninjago History Museum.

The Hands of Time proceed with their master plan. Krux has bred an army of Vermillion warriors formed from snakes. The twins abduct Cyrus Borg and various workers from Ninjago City to build the Iron Doom, a time-traveling mech. The ninja attempt to fight the Vermillion but discover that they can immediately reform upon defeat. Kai visits Ninjago History Museum and fights the Time Twins with Nya. Krux tells Kai that his parents were traitors and helped the Hands of Time forge the Vermillion armour. The Vermillion recover the Slow-Mo Time Blade from the desert, but the ninja take it from them. The Vermillion then launch an attack on the Temple of Airjitzu and during the battle, the Hands of Time escape with both Time Blades and Wu as their captive. They retrieve the Pause Time Blade from the top of a mountain.

The ninja split up to rescue Cyrus, the workers, and Wu. Kai visits the Blacksmith Shop and confronts his father, calling him a traitor. His parents explain that they were forced to work for Krux and that 40 years prior they hid the Reversal Time Blade in a secret location. The Hands of Time force Kai and Nya to retrieve the Reversal Blade from the Boiling Sea. They travel to its location by creating a Fusion Dragon, but on their return are attacked by Krux and Acronix, resulting in Ray being hit by the Forward Time Blade, which rapidly advances his age.

The Hands of Time travel back 40 years to the same temporal point when they battled the Elemental Masters. The Vermillion warriors attack the monastery, but Kai, Nya, and Wu, who have followed them into the vortex, join the fight and the Elemental Masters get the upper hand. During the battle, the Time Twins alter history by forcing Wu to yield and this reverts present-day Ninjago to its pre-technology age. Kai and Nya ride the Fusion Dragon to battle the Iron Doom. The Hands of Time open another time vortex to escape, but Kai, Nya, and Wu confront them. During the fight, Wu rips out the Reversal Blade, sabotaging the Iron Doom in the process. Kai and Nya are thrown off the mech with the Reversal Blade and return to the present day. Ninjago is restored to its technological glory and Kai uses the Reversal Time Blade to cure his father's rapid aging. The Time Twins and Wu are lost in time aboard the Iron Doom.

Episodes

Reception

Ratings 
On 15 May 2017, the Hands of Time premier aired on Cartoon Network and achieved position 77 in the Top 150 Monday Original Cable Telecasts with 0.73 million viewers.

Critical reception 
Reviewer Melissa Camacho for Common Sense Media gave Hands of Time a 3 out of 5 star rating and noted that the season has "lots of fantasy violence" and themes of "loyalty, teamwork, and sacrifice". The reviewer also commented, "This entertaining instalment of the popular action series continues to offer a well-developed story featuring the franchise's trademark lessons on patience, equality, and, above all, loyalty and teamwork." RJ Carter for Critical Blast gave the season a 4.5 out of 5 rating commenting, "For a season that's only ten episodes long, and with episodes that are barely 30 minutes, Lego Ninjago manages to pack in a ton of story that keeps you coming back show after show."

References

Primary

Secondary 

Hands of Time
2017 Canadian television seasons
2017 Danish television seasons